Held in Prague once every fourth years since 1967, the Prague Quadrennial of Performance Design and Space or Prague Quadrennial is the world's largest event in the field of scenography, consisting of a competitive presentation of contemporary work in a variety of performance design disciplines and genres including costume, stage, lighting, sound design, and theatre architecture for dance, opera, drama, site-specific, multi-media performances, and performance art.

History 

During the São Paulo Art Biennial in 1959, a special exhibit, designed by František Tröster, illustrated the development of Czech and Slovak stage design and theatre architecture during the period from 1914-1959. The result of the exhibition was a gold medal for Czechoslovakia. Continued Czech success during the next three Biennales led to an offer for Prague to host an international exhibition of stage design in Europe. Since its premiere in 1967, the international exhibition has been held regularly every four years, and has come to be known as the Prague Quadrennial.

Important artists who marked the history of the theater and the scenography participated and exposed at the Prague Quadrennial, such as Salvador Dalí, Josef Svoboda, Oscar Niemayer, Tadeusz Kantor, Guy-Claude François and Ralph Koltai, as well as figures of the contemporary theater, such as Robert Wilson, Heiner Goebbels and Renzo Piano.

Awards 

The exhibitions are judged and estimated by an International Jury, attributing the following awards:
Golden Triga for the Best Exposition 
Gold Medal for the Best Stage Design
Gold Medal for the Best Theatre Costume
Gold Medal for the Best Realization of a Production
Gold Medal for the Best Work in Theatre Architecture and Performance Space
Gold Medal for the Best Use of Theatre Technology
Gold Medal for the Best Exposition in the Student Section
Gold Medal for the Most Promising Talent in the Student Section
Gold Medal for the Best Curatorial Concept of an Exposition

The Golden Triga was awarded in 1967 to France, in 1971 to the GDR, in 1975 to the USSR, in 1979 to Great Britain, in 1983 to the GDR, in 1987 to the USA, in 1991 to Great Britain, in 1995 to Brazil, in 1999 to the Czech Republic, in 2003 to Great Britain, in 2007 to Russia and in 2011 to Brazil.

The 12th edition of the Prague Quadrennial in 2011 

International Competitive exhibition:
Section of Countries and Region
Architecture Section – Now/Next Performance Space at the Crossroads  
Student Section 
Extreme Costume exhibition

Projects:
Intersection, Intimacy and Spectacle, an undisciplined project 
Scenofest. an educational project of OISTAT and the Prague Quadrennial.
Light and Sound project
PQ+, accompanying program

Participating countries in the International Competitive Exhibition include Argentina, Armenia, Australia, Austria, Belarus, Belgium, Brazil, Bulgaria, Canada, Chile, China, Colombia, Croatia, Cuba, Cyprus, Czech Republic, Denmark, Estonia, Finland, France, Georgia, Germany, Greece, Hong Kong, Hungary, Iceland, India, Israel, Italy, Japan, Kazakhstan, Republic of Korea, Latvia, Lebanon, Lithuania, Macedonia, Mongolia, Mexico, Netherlands, New Zealand, Nigeria, Norway, Peru, Philippines, Poland, Portugal, Republic of South Africa, Romania, Russia, Serbia, Singapore, Slovakia, Slovenia, Spain, Sweden, Switzerland, Taiwan, Turkey, United Kingdom, Uruguay, USA, and Venezuela.

In 2011 the Hungarian section of PQ will be represented by Bodza W Mihaly's oeuvre. The section is presented by György Árvai, Anikó B. Nagy, Judit Csanádi, Péter Horgas, Gábor Medvigy.

Work is judged in a variety of categories, including "Architecture," "Costumes," and a "Student" section. But the center is the "Countries and Regions" category, where visitors can immerse themselves in theatrical installations from a record-breaking 62 countries, designed by organizations and individual artists including Ruhr Triennale, SITI Theater Company, Joao Brites, and Yukio Horio.

The upcoming, 13th edition of the Prague Quadrennial in 2015 

The next edition of Prague Quadrennial of Performance Design and Space wll be held in June 2015. 
The main thematic axis of the event will be centered on a research and artistic project SharedSpace: Music, Weather, Politics which started in May 2013 and runs through 2016.

Further information about Prague Quadrennial 2015 will be released in September 2013.

The Prague Quadrennial online: e-scenography 

E-scenography is an online informational community discussing issues connected to scenography thanks to a newsletter, an art school database and an online library.

References

External links 
Prague Quadrennial
e-scenography
Prague Quadrennial page at Scenography - The Theatre Design Website
 Images from the 2007 Prague Quadrennial

Scenic design
Exhibitions